James Ley is a Scottish playwright and screenwriter based in Edinburgh. He is best known for the play Love Song to Lavender Menace which premiered at Royal Lyceum Theatre, Edinburgh in 2017.

Ley’s plays include I Heart Maths for Oran Mor, SPAIN for Glasgay! and UP for The Vault, Edinburgh Fringe.

Written as an LGBT History Month Scotland Cultural Commission [1] Ley's play Love Song to Lavender Menace . the play explores the story of the Lavender Menace Bookshop in Edinburgh which operated between 1982 and 1987. The play was first performed at the Village Pub Theatre, Leith which presents readings of short plays and was co-founded by Ley.

Selected works 

 The Ego Plays, Oberon Books, 2011, 
 Love Song to Lavender Menace, Oberon Books, 2017,

References 

21st-century Scottish dramatists and playwrights
Scottish LGBT dramatists and playwrights
Writers from Edinburgh
Living people
Year of birth missing (living people)